Gaetano Tanti is a Maltese trade unionist. He joined the Union Haddiema Maghqudin (Malta Workers' Union) in February 1976. In November 1987 he was appointed part-time Secretary of the General Service Section. In January 1991 he was appointed full-time Secretary of the same Section and a few months later the General Council of the Union appointed him also Assistant Secretary-General. He took the office of President of the UHM in May 1998.

References

Maltese trade union leaders
Year of birth missing (living people)
Living people